The 2023 Africa U-20 Cup of Nations is an international association football tournament held in Egypt. The twelve national teams involved in the tournament were required to register a squad of 21 players; only players in these squads were eligible to take part in the tournament. Each player had to have been born after 1 January 2003. All ages as of the start of the tournament. The squads for the 2023 Africa U-20 Cup of Nations were announced on 14 February 2023.

Group A

Egypt
Egypt announced their squad of 26 players on 9 February 2023.

Head coach: Mahmoud Gaber

Mozambique
Mozambique announced their squad of 23 players on 6 February 2023.

Head coach: Dário Monteiro

Senegal
Senegal announced their squad of 26 players on 8 February 2023.

Head coach: Malick Daf

Nigeria
Nigeria announced their squad of 21 players on 10 February 2023, with midfielders Musa Usman and Shatima Umar alongside forwards Kingsley James and Ayuba Abubakar being added as reserve players. On 14 February 2023, CAF confirmed the Nigeria's squad, with defender Michael Ologo being replaced by forward Ayuba Abubakar.

Head coach: Ladan Bosso

Group B

Uganda
Uganda announced a provisional squad of 50 players on 20 January 2023. The final squad of 25 players was announced on 11 February 2023.

Head coach: Jackson Mayanja

Central African Republic
Central African Republic announced their squad of 25 players on 3 February 2023.

Head coach: Sébastien Ngato

South Sudan
South Sudan announced a provisional squad of 51 players on 16 January 2023. The final squad of 26 players was announced on 7 February 2023.

Head coach: Peter James

Congo
Congo announced their squad of 26 players on 9 February 2023.

Head coach: Marie Joseph Madienguela

Group C

Gambia
The Gambia announced their final squad of 25 players on 9 February 2023.

Head coach: Abdoulie Bojang

Tunisia
Tunisia announced their final squad of 26 players on 8 February 2023.

Head coach: Adel Sellimi

Benin
Benin announced a squad of 26 players on 24 January 2023, which was later confirmed by CAF as Benin's final squad with a single change, defender René Akakpo being replaced by Sèwanou Winsavi.

Head coach: Mattias Deguenon

Zambia
Zambia announced a squad of 25 players on 1 February 2023, which was later confirmed by CAF as Zambia's final squad. However, on 18 February 2023, the Football Association of Zambia announced a final list reduced to 21 players with midfielder Joseph Sabobo Banda being withdrawn due to injury and defender Luckson Tembo, midfielder Moses Mulenga and forward Henry Mbuti being ruled out.

Head coach: Chisi Mbewe

References

2023 Africa U-20 Cup of Nations
Africa U-20 Cup of Nations squads